Oakley is a locality in the Peel Region of Western Australia. Its local government area is the Shire of Murray.

Oakley is located at the foot of the Darling Scarp and is very lowly populated, it is one of the locations of Alcoa's three alumina refineries, which is named after the nearest large town in the region, Pinjarra.

References

Towns in Western Australia
Shire of Murray